Low House may refer to:

in the United Kingdom
Low House, Wetheral, in Cumbria, England

in the United States (by state)

Low House (Norfolk, Connecticut), listed on the NRHP in Litchfield County, Connecticut
Juliette Gordon Low Historic District, Savannah, Georgia, a National Historic Landmark which includes the Andrew Low House
Morris Low Bungalow, Paris, Idaho, listed on the NRHP in Bear Lake County, Idaho
Joseph W. Low House, Bangor, Maine, listed on the NRHP in Penobscot County, Maine
Thomas Low House, Ipswich, Massachusetts, listed on the NRHP in Essex County, Massachusetts 
Effingham Low House, Pinebrook, New Jersey, listed on the NRHP in Morris County, New Jersey
 Cornelius Low House, Piscataway, New Jersey, NRHP-listed as "Ivy Hall"
Low House (Whitsett, North Carolina), listed on the NRHP in Guilford County, North Carolina
 William G. Low House, Bristol, Rhode Island, demolished 1962
Reichardt-Low House, Brenham, Texas, listed on the NRHP in Washington County, Texas

See also
Lowe House (disambiguation)